Peroxisomal targeting signal 1 receptor (PTS1R) is a protein that in humans is encoded by the PEX5 gene.

PTS1R is a peroxisomal targeting sequence involved in the specific transport of molecules for oxidation inside the peroxisome. SKL binds to PTS1R in the cytosol followed by binding to the Pex14p receptor allowing importation of the peroxisomal protein through the pexsubunit transporter.

Diseases associated with dysfunctional PTS1R receptors include X-linked adrenoleukodystrophy and Zellweger syndrome.

Interactions 

PEX5 has been shown to interact with PEX12, PEX13 and PEX14.

References

Further reading

External links 
  GeneReviews/NCBI/NIH/UW entry on Peroxisome Biogenesis Disorders, Zellweger Syndrome Spectrum
 OMIM entries on Peroxisome Biogenesis Disorders, Zellweger Syndrome Spectrum